Talla Castle, also known as Inch Talla or Inchtalla Castle, was a 15th-century castle on Inchtalla upon Lake of Menteith, Scotland.

The castle was built by Malise Graham, Earl of Mentieth starting in 1427.

Citations

References
Coventry, Martin. Castles of the Clans: the strongholds and seats of 750 Scottish families and clans. Musselburgh. (2008)

Castles in Stirling (council area)
Clan Graham
Lake of Menteith